Khadijah Azhari (born 19 November 1967), better known as Ayu Azhari, is an Indonesian actress, model and author of mixed Indian and Sundanese descent.

Biography 
Azhari was born on 19 November 1967. She comes from Bangka, the oldest of seven children of H. Abdullah Azhari and Hj. Khairani.

Azhari made her feature film début in 1984 in Akibat Buah Terlarang (Effects from the Forbidden Fruit). Director Teguh Karya, who saw her in the film, adopted her as a protégée. Her first role for him was as a minor character in the stage drama Pernikahan Darah (Blood Wedding), in which the director badgered her for not carrying her voice. In 1986 she played in Karya's film Ibunda (Mother). She took a small role in Karya's last feature film, Pacar Ketinggalan Kereta (Lover Left by the Train) in 1989.

In 1990, Azhari received a Citra Award for Best Supporting Actress at the Indonesian Film Festival for her role in Dua Kekasih (Two Lovers)

By the early 2000s, Azhari was one of the highest paid television stars in Indonesia. It was rumoured that she earned Rp. 20 million (US$2,200) per episode, a rumour which Azhari denied. She had also released a studio album, Dung Indung.

In 2003, Azhari wrote a book on the dangers of voyeurism after her sister, Sarah, was one of several female celebrities portrayed changing their clothes on an underground VCD. Research for the book included interviewing victims of voyeurism. When it was finished, three publishers offered to take the book.

In 2010, Azhari registered with the Indonesian Democratic Party – Struggle to run for Deputy Regent of Sukabumi Regency. She reportedly invested Rp. 10 billion (US$1.1 million) in her campaign. During her political campaign, her opponents spread racy pictures of a woman resembling her with Frank Zagarino; Azhari took it as an attempt to discredit her. She was ultimately not chosen to run.

In late 2011, Azhari released a cookbook filled with Bangkan recipes.

Personal life 
Azhari has been married several times. Her first marriage was in 1990 to Djody Gondokusumo, with whom she had a son. Within four years she had married Teemu Yusuf Ibrahim and had another two sons and one daughter. , she is married to musician Mike Tramp, best known as the vocalist of the rock band White Lion. She has a total of six children.

Awards and nominations

References 
Footnotes

Bibliography

External links 
 

1967 births
Living people
Sundanese people
Indonesian people of Indian descent
Citra Award winners
Indonesian actresses
People from the Bangka Belitung Islands